Harold Tanner (born 1932) is an investment banker and philanthropist.

Education
Tanner graduated from the Cornell University School of Industrial and Labor Relations in 1952 and earned an MBA from Harvard University in 1956.

Charitable Activities
Tanner is a longtime member of the American Jewish Committee's Board of Governors, and served the human relations organization as Chair of its Board of Trustees, Member of its Executive Committee, and from 2001 to 2004 as its President. He serves as Chairman of the AJC Transatlantic Institute. From 2005-7 he served as Chairman of the Conference of Presidents of Major Jewish Organizations.

Tanner has served as a Cornell trustee since 1982, including as vice chairman of the board and Chairman from 1997-2002. He served on the Trustee Executive Committee from 1986-2002.

Awards
Tanner a recipient of:
 Herbert Lehman Award of the American Jewish Committee in 1995.
 A Foremost benefactor of Cornell.
 Harvard Business School Alumni Achievement Award in 1992.
 Cornell ILR Jerome Alpern Distinguished Alumni Award in 2002.

External links
 Cornell website biography
 Second Cornell biography

References

Cornell University alumni
Harvard Business School alumni
Living people
American bankers
1932 births
Charles H. Revson Foundation
American Jewish Committee